Paul Laurence Dunbar School is a historic school building located in the Templetown neighborhood of Philadelphia, Pennsylvania.  It was designed by Irwin T. Catharine and built in 1931–1932.  It is a four-story, 14 bay, orange brick building on a raised basement in the Moderne-style. It features ribbon bands of windows, brick pilasters with compound capitals, and spandrel panels.  It was named for African American poet and author Paul Laurence Dunbar (1872-1906).

It was added to the National Register of Historic Places in 1986. It is a middle school in the School District of Philadelphia.

References

School buildings on the National Register of Historic Places in Philadelphia
Moderne architecture in Pennsylvania
School buildings completed in 1932
Templetown, Philadelphia
School District of Philadelphia
1932 establishments in Pennsylvania